Piano Concerto in F major may refer to:
 Piano Concerto No. 11 (Mozart), K. 413
 Piano Concerto No. 19 (Mozart), K. 459
 Piano Concerto No. 5 (Saint-Saëns), Op. 103, the Egyptian
 Piano Concerto No. 2 (Shostakovich), Op. 102